Gocha Gujabidze (born 7 July 1971) is a retired Georgian professional football player.

1971 births
Living people
Footballers from Georgia (country)
Expatriate footballers from Georgia (country)
Expatriate footballers in Russia
FC Dinamo Batumi players
Expatriate footballers in Poland
FC Guria Lanchkhuti players
FC Rostov players
FC Alazani Gurjaani players
Russian Premier League players
KSZO Ostrowiec Świętokrzyski players
Georgia (country) international footballers
FC Zugdidi players
Expatriate sportspeople from Georgia (country) in Poland
Association football defenders